Ekaterina Vladimirovna Apraksina (nee Golitysna; Russian - Екатерина Владимировна Апраксина; 30 May 1770, Moscow - 14 March 1854) was a Russian noblewoman.

Life
The eldest daughter of prince Vladimir Borisovich Golitsyn and his wife Natalya, she was educated by her mother. In 1783 she and her family moved to France and they settled in a palace in Paris next door to Marie Antoinette, with Ekaterina and her mother attending balls and receptions. She and her family toured England in 1789 before returning to Russia the following year, settling in St Petersburg, where she was presented at court and became a lady in waiting to Catherine the Great. In 1841 she also became a lady in waiting to Grand Duchess Elena Pavlovna of Russia.

Marriage and issue
On 13 July 1793 she married general Stepan Stepanovich Apraksin (1757-1827), a cousin of her mother, one of the richest men in Russia and considered to be one of the handsomest men of the time. It was a happy marriage and they had five children:

Natalia Stepanovna (14 November 1794 – 7 May 1890), married Sergei Golitsyn (17 February 1783 – 14 March 1833), died without issue;
Vladimir Stepanovich (1796-1833), married Sofia Petrovna Tolstoy (1800-1886);
Stepan Stepanovich (5 December 1797 – 15 December 1799);
Sofia Stepanovna (1798-1885), married Aleksey Grigorevich Scerbatov, with whom she had five children;
Agrippina Stepanovna (5 December 1799 – 13 August 1800).

Sources
http://www.vostlit.info/Texts/Dokumenty/Kavkaz/XIX/1840-1860/Poltorackij/text1.htm

1770 births
1854 deaths